Patient Preference and Adherence is a peer-reviewed healthcare journal focusing on patient preference and adherence throughout the therapeutic continuum. The journal was established in 2007 and is published by Dove Medical Press.

External links 
 

English-language journals
Dove Medical Press academic journals
Open access journals
Public health journals
Publications established in 2007